Chicken noodle soup may refer to:

 a variant of chicken soup
 "Chicken Noodle Soup" (Webstar and Young B song), 2006
 "Chicken Noodle Soup" (J-Hope song), 2019